is a passenger railway station located in Seya-ku, Yokohama, Japan, operated by the private railway operator Sagami Railway (Sotetsu).

Lines 
Mitsukyō Station is served by the Sagami Railway Main Line, and lies 13.6 kilometers from the starting point of the line at Yokohama Station.

Station layout
The station consists of two opposed side platforms serving two tracks. The station building is elevated, and located above the platforms and tracks.

Platforms

Adjacent stations

History
Mitsukyō Station was opened on May 12, 1926 as a station of the Jinchū Railway, the predecessor to the current Sagami Railway Main Line. The current station building was completed on October, 1986.

Passenger statistics
In fiscal 2019, the station was used by an average of 57,806 passengers daily.

The passenger figures for previous years are as shown below.

Surrounding area
 St. Marianna University Hospital
Kanagawa Prefectural Seya High School
Kanagawa Prefectural Mitsusakai School for the Disabled
Seya Ward General Government Building
Seya Ward Office

See also
 List of railway stations in Japan

References

External links 

 Official home page  

Railway stations in Kanagawa Prefecture
Railway stations in Japan opened in 1926
Railway stations in Yokohama